Casper's Halloween Special (also known as Casper Saves Halloween and Casper the Friendly Ghost: He Ain't Scary, He's Our Brother) is a 1979 animated Halloween television special produced by Hanna-Barbera featuring Casper the Friendly Ghost and his friend Hairy Scarey from the animated series Casper and the Angels. The special was directed by Carl Urbano and premiered on NBC on October 30, 1979.

Like many animated series created by Hanna-Barbera in the 1970s, the show contained a laugh track created by the studio.

Plot
On Halloween night, Hairy Scary The Ghost, Winifred The Witch and Screech The Ghost are plotting their mean-spirited spookings. Casper refuses to join them and decides to go trick-or-treating dressed as a real boy, but neighborhood kids see through his disguise and run away in fear. Casper is heartbroken until he meets a special group of orphans who accept him for who he is, a ghost. But their fun is soon spoiled as Hairy Scarey and his ghostly crew interfere. Now it is up to Casper and his new friends to stop their ghastly games and save Halloween before it is too late.

Cast
 Julie McWhirter as Casper The Friendly Ghost
 John Stephenson as Hairy Scary The Ghost / The Butler / Rural Man
 Hal Smith as Mr. Duncan / Skull
 Diane McCannon as J.R.
 Marilyn Schreffler as Winifred The Witch
 Frank Welker as Black Cat / Nice Man / Dog
 Ginny Tyler as Lovella / Bejewelled Dowager / Rural Lady
 Lucille Bliss as Gervais / Carmelita / Nice Lady
 Michael Sheehan as Screech The Ghost
 Greg Alter as Dirk

Production credits
Executive Producers: William Hanna and Joseph Barbera
Producer: Alex Lovy
Associate Producer: Doug Paterson
Director: Carl Urbano
Story: Larz Bourne, Bob Ogle
Story Direction: Don Sheppard, Greg Marshall
Recording Director: Art Scott
Voices: Greg Alter, Lucille Bliss, Hal Smith, Ginny Tyler, Frank Welker, Diann McCannon, Julie McWhirter, Marilyn Schreffler, Michael Sheehan, John Stephenson
Musical sequences directed by: Art Scott
Musical Director: Hoyt Curtin
Musical Supervisor: Paul DeKorte
Character Design: Don Morgan
Sound Directors: Richard Olson, Bill Getty
Layout Director: Steve Lumley
Layout: Joe Shearer, Shane Porteus, Deane Taylor
Animation Director: Geoffrey Collins
Key Animators: Peter Gardiner, Gerry Grabner, Greg Ingram, Paul Maron, Henry Neville
Animators: Susan Beak, Gairden Cooke, Dick Dunn, Peter Eastment, Don Ezard, Nicholas Harding, Chris Hague, Pamela Lofts, Peter Luschwitz, Paul Mason, Paul McAdam, John Martin, Ray Nowland, Vivien Ray, Andrew Szermenyei, Jean Tych, Kaye Watts
Assistant Animation Supervisor: Martin Chatfield
Assistant Animators: Jac Appel, Paul Baker, Fernando Bernia, Mark Benvenuti, Astrid Brennan, Jo-Anne Beresford, Rodney D'Silva, Marc Erasmus, John Eyley, Eva Helischer, Ian Harrowell, John Hull, Denise Kirkham, Lucie Laarakkers, Jane LeRossignol, Steve Lyons, Helen McAdam, Marie Orr, Kevin Peaty, Philip Pepper, Cliff Seeto, Stella Wakil, Geoff White, Milan Zahorsky
Supervising Director: Chris Cuddington
Animation Checking: Narelle Nimon, Ellen Bailey, Liz Lane, Frances Mould, Renee Robinson
Backgrounds: Richard Zaloudek, Sue Speer, Jerry Liew, Ken Wright, Milan Zahorsky Snr., Zdenka Ebner
Production Co-ordinator: Judy Cross
Production Control: Vicki Joyce
Xerox:  Jack Pietruska
Paint: Narelle Derrick
Paint Check: Liz Goodwin
Camera: Mark D'Arcy-Irvine, Virginia Browne, Carole Laird, Garry Page, Jan Cregan, Sean Bell
Editing: Robert Claglia
Supervising Film Editor: Larry C. Cowan
Dubbing Supervisor: Pat Foley
Music Editors: Terry Moore, Joe Sandusky
Effects Editors: Julia Bagdonas, Sue Brown, Catherine MacKenzie
Show Editor: Gil Iverson
Negative Consultant: William E. DeBoer
Post Production Supervisor: Joed Eaton

Home media
Turner Home Entertainment released Casper Saves Halloween on VHS on August 29, 1995.

On October 1, 2013, Warner Bros. released Casper's Halloween Special on DVD in region 1 via their Warner Archive Collection. This is a manufacture-on-demand (MOD) release, available exclusively through Warner's online store and Amazon.com. Also included on this disc is the 1972 special The Thanksgiving That Almost Wasn't, also produced by Hanna-Barbera.

Currently the special is streaming on the Boomerang streaming service in the movies section.

See also
 Casper's First Christmas
 Casper and the Angels

References

External links

1979 television specials
1970s American television specials
1970s animated television specials
Halloween television specials
Harvey Comics series and characters
Hanna-Barbera television specials
NBC television specials
Ghosts in television
Casper the Friendly Ghost films
Films directed by Carl Urbano